Donatien Schauly (born 9 June 1985, in Mulhouse) is a French equestrian. At the 2012 Summer Olympics he competed in the Individual eventing.

References

French male equestrians
1985 births
Living people
Olympic equestrians of France
Equestrians at the 2012 Summer Olympics

Sportspeople from Mulhouse